Inverness Caledonian Thistle F.C. in their 11th season in Scottish football competed in the Scottish Premier League, Scottish League Cup and the Scottish Cup in season 2004–05.

Results

Scottish Premier League

Final League table

Scottish League Cup

Scottish Cup

References
caleythistleonline

Inverness Caledonian Thistle F.C. seasons
Inverness